Asia Uncut was a variety chat show hosted by Jon Niermann, the president of Electronic Arts, Asia.  The show premiered in March 2009 and was aired in many countries via STAR World.

References

External links
Asia Uncut website

2009 Chinese television series debuts
Chinese television talk shows